Bonyab (also Romanized as Bonyāb and Buniāb; also known as Bonīābād and Buniah) is a village in Darmian Rural District, in the Central District of Darmian County, South Khorasan Province, Iran. At the 2006 census, its population was 189, in 46 families.

References 

Populated places in Darmian County